The Dardanelles Fortified Area Command or Mediterranean Strait Fortified Area Command or Çanakkale Fortified Area Command (Turkish: Bahr-i Sefîd Boğazı Mevki(i) Müstahkem Komutanlığı or Akdeniz Boğazı Müstahkem Mevki(i) Komutanlığı or Çanakkale Boğazı Müstahkem Mevki(i) Komutanlığı or Çanakkale Müstahkem Mevki(i) Komutanlığı) was the Ottoman fortified area command and was formed to defend against attacks on the Dardanelles from the Aegean Sea.

Formations

Order of Battle, 1911 
With reorganizations of the Ottoman Army, to include the creation of corps level headquarters, by 1911 the fortified area command was headquartered in Çanakkale, under the command of II Corps. The Dardanelles Fortified Area Command in 1911 was structured as such:

Dardanelles Fortified Area Command, Çanakkale
3rd Heavy Artillery Regiment
4th Heavy Artillery Regiment
5th Heavy Artillery Regiment
Independent Heavy Artillery Regiment
Torpedo Detachment
Mine Detachment
Wireless Detachment

Order of Battle, December 1912 
In December 1912, the area command was structured as follows:

Dardanelles Fortified Area Command (Çanakkale, Commander: Mirliva Fahri Pasha)
3rd Heavy Artillery Regiment
4th Heavy Artillery Regiment
5th Heavy Artillery Regiment
Independent Heavy Artillery Regiment
Torpedo Detachment
Underwater Mine Detachment
27th Infantry Division (Eceabat)
Provisional Infantry Division (Bolayır)
Afyon Redif Division (Eceabat)
Çanakkale Redif Division (Cape Helles)
Erdemit Redif Division (Suvla Bey)
Kavak Detachment (Kavak)
Menderes Detachment (Kum Kale)

Order of Battle, 1915 
The Dardanelles Fortified Area was first-class fortified area, the commander of this fortified area was given the corps' authority. It was headquartered in Çanakkale. The formation of the fortified area in 1915 was as follows:

Dardanelles Fortified Area Command, Çanakkale
2nd Heavy Artillery Brigade (İkinci Ağır Topçu Tugayı), Çimenlik Tabyası
3rd Heavy Artillery Regiment
4th Heavy Artillery Regiment
5th Heavy Artillery Regiment
Fortress Engineer Company
Engineer Construction Company
Communication Company
Mine Detachment
Searchlight Detachment (8 searchlight)
Fortified Area Ammunition Depot Detachment
Bolayır Ammunition Depot Detachment
Sea Transportation (3 motorboat with 3 small boat)

Sources

Military units and formations of the Ottoman Empire in World War I
History of the Dardanelles
Adrianople vilayet
Fortifications in Turkey
Military units and formations of the Ottoman Empire
Army units and formations of Turkey